Brent Dean Robbins is associate professor of psychology at Point Park University in Pittsburgh, Pennsylvania. His areas of research include grief, humor, self-consciousness, spirituality/religion, death anxiety, and the medicalization of the body. He is editor-in-chief and founder of Janus Head: Journal of Interdisciplinary Studies in Literature, Continental Philosophy, Phenomenological Psychology, and the Arts, and is a board member for a number of journals, including International Journal of Transpersonal Studies, the International Journal of Existential Psychology and Psychotherapy, PsyCRITIQUES, and Terrorism Research. Robbins is a co-editor of The Legacy of R.D. Laing, published by Trivium Press. Robbins is a recipient of the Harmi Carari Early Career Award, from the Society for Humanistic Psychology. He holds a doctorate in clinical psychology from Duquesne University.

In 2011, Robbins co-authored an open letter from the Society for Humanistic Psychology regarding the Diagnostic and Statistical Manual of Mental Disorderss fifth edition, the DSM-5. The letter has been endorsed by thirteen other American Psychological Association divisions, and has been signed as a petition by over 15,000 people. In a recent San Francisco Chronicle article about the debate over the DSM-5, Robbins noted that, under the new guidelines, certain responses to grief could be labeled as pathological disorders, instead of being recognized as being normal human experiences.

Brent was born into a nominally Catholic family, became an atheist when in college, and then he reverted to the Catholic faith after experienced something in a retreat.

Selected works
Drugging Our Children: How Profiteers are Pushing Antipsychotics on Our Youngest and What We Can Do to Stop It with Sharna Olfman, Ph.D., 2012.
Co-author of "A cultural-existential approach to therapy: Merleau-Ponty's phenomenology of embodiment and its implications for practice," (with co-author Felder, A.J.) Theory and Psychology, 2011.
"Conflicts of interest in research on antipsychotic treatment of pediatric bipolar disorder, temper dysregulation disorder, and attenuated psychotic symptoms syndrome: Exploring the unholy alliance between big pharma and psychiatry," (with Point Park students/co-authors Higgins, M.; Fischer, M.; and Over, K.) Journal of Psychological Issues in Organizational Culture, 2011.
Co-author of "Resiliency as a virtue: Contributions from humanistic and positive psychology," Continuity versus creative response to challenge: The primacy of resilience and resourcefulness in life and therapy, 2011.
"Joy," The Encyclopedia of Positive Psychology, 2009.
"The self-regulation of humor expression: A mixed method, phenomenological approach to the study of suppressed laughter," (Co-authored with Kyla Vandree), and "What is the good life? Positive psychology and the renaissance of humanistic psychology," The Humanistic Psychologist, 2009 and 2008.
"Lessons from the dead: Undergraduate experiences of work with cadavers," (Co-authored with A. Tomaka, C. Innus, J. Patterson, & G. Styn). Omega: Journal of Death and Dying, 2008.

References

Living people
21st-century American psychologists
Diagnostic and Statistical Manual of Mental Disorders
Converts to Roman Catholicism from atheism or agnosticism
Year of birth missing (living people)